Hysteria is the fourth studio album by English rock band Def Leppard, released on 3 August 1987 through Mercury Records. It is Def Leppard's best-selling album to date, selling over 20 million copies worldwide, including 12 million in the US, and spawning seven hit singles. The album charted at number one on both the Billboard 200 and the UK Albums Chart.

Hysteria was produced by Robert John "Mutt" Lange. The title of the album was thought up by drummer Rick Allen, referring to his 1984 car accident, the amputation of his arm, and the ensuing worldwide media coverage surrounding it. It is the last album to feature guitarist Steve Clark before his death, although songs co-written by him would appear on the band's next album, Adrenalize.

The album is the follow-up to the band's 1983 breakthrough Pyromania. Hysterias creation took over three years and was plagued by delays, including the aftermath of drummer Rick Allen's accident that cost him his left arm on 31 December 1984. Subsequent to the album's release, Def Leppard published a book titled Animal Instinct: The Def Leppard Story, written by Rolling Stone magazine senior editor David Fricke, on the three-year recording process of Hysteria and the tough times the band endured through the mid-1980s. Lasting 62 minutes and 32 seconds, the album is the band's longest to date.

History
Initially, Hysteria was to be named Animal Instinct and produced by Lange, but he dropped out after pre-production sessions, citing exhaustion from a gruelling schedule from the past few years. Meat Loaf songwriter Jim Steinman was brought in, but Steinman's intention to make a raw-sounding record that captured the moment conflicted with the band's interest in creating a bigger, more pristine pop production. Joe Elliott later stated in an interview: "Todd Rundgren produced (Meat Loaf's) Bat Out of Hell. Jim Steinman wrote it".

Sessions with Steinman began at Wisseloord Studios on 11 August 1984, with Neil Dorfsman as engineer. However, the social divide and conflict in visions of the album between both the band and Steinman became problematic during the sessions, the latter being more into theatrical ideas which did not sit well with the group. By mid-October 1984, Steinman was ousted from the project, along with Dorfsman. Dorfsman would go on to mention they “barely [had] drums and bass on seven songs” - he'd fly straight from Holland to Montserrat to produce Dire Straits' Brothers in Arms album.

After parting ways with Steinman, the band tried to produce the album themselves with Lange's engineer Nigel Green with no success, and initial recording sessions were entirely scrapped.

On 31 December 1984, Rick Allen lost his left arm when his Corvette flipped off a country road. Following the accident, the band stood by Allen's decision to return to the drum kit despite his disability, using a combination electronic/acoustic kit with a set of electronic pedals that triggered (via MIDI) the sounds that he would have played with his left arm. The band slowly continued production until Lange unexpectedly returned a year later, and Allen mastered his customised drum kit. However, the sessions were further delayed by Lange's own auto accident (sustaining leg injuries from which he quickly recovered) and a bout of the mumps suffered by singer Joe Elliott in 1986.

The final recording sessions took place in January 1987 for the song "Armageddon It" and a last-minute composition "Pour Some Sugar on Me", though Lange spent another three months mixing the tracks. The album was finally released worldwide on 3 August 1987, with "Animal" as the lead single in most countries except for the US and Canada where "Women" was the first single.

Concept
The album's goal, set out by Lange, was to be a hard rock version of Michael Jackson's Thriller, in that every track was a potential hit single. Songs were therefore written with this concept in mind, disappointing heavy metal fans who clamoured for a straight sequel to Pyromania. One song, "Love Bites", was already mostly written in the vein of a country ballad by Mutt Lange when he brought it to the band's attention.

While Pyromania contained traces of Def Leppard's original traditional heavy metal sound found on their first two albums, Hysteria removed them in favour of the latest sonic technology available at the time (best displayed on "Rocket", "Love Bites", "Excitable", and "Gods of War"). As with Pyromania, every song was recorded by every member in the studio separately instead of the whole band. The multiple vocal harmonies were enhanced by Lange's techniques, even pitching background vocals on all tracks. Guitar parts were now focused more on emphasising melody than hard rock's more basic and clichéd riffs.

The band used the Rockman amplifier, developed by guitarist Tom Scholz from the rock band Boston, to record the album. Engineer Mike Shipley described the Rockman as "a shitty little box" with "a godawful sound" that "had no real balls to it", but it was used because the other amplifiers used had an excessively "crunchy" sound ill-suited to layering guitars and which Lange did not think was "commercial" enough.

In addition, all of the album's drum sounds were samples recorded by Lange and the engineers, then played from the Fairlight CMI. In a 1999 interview with Mix Magazine, Shipley noted, "Pyromania was done the same way, on cheesy 8-bit Fairlight technology where we had to figure out how to record everything at half speed into the Fairlight to make it sound like it had some tone to it, and we'd be stacking up a bunch of snares and bass drums." Shipley also noted that the drum sounds were dealt with last because each song's structure could change so radically, and because of technical difficulties. This unique approach sometimes led to painstaking lengths of time in the recording studio.

The smash single, "Pour Some Sugar on Me", was the last song written but was quickly finished within two weeks. In sharp contrast, the final version of "Animal" took almost a full three years to be developed but was not as successful as other singles despite reaching number 19 on the Billboard Hot 100.

Commercial performance
David Simone, managing director of Phonogram Records at the time, said the album might have been the most expensive record made in the U.K. According to guitarist Phil Collen, the album had to sell a minimum of 5 million copies to break even.

The popularity of Def Leppard in their homeland had significantly grown over the previous four years, and Hysteria topped the charts in Britain in its first week of release. The album was also a major success in other parts of Europe. In the US, however, the band initially struggled to regain the momentum of Pyromania that was lost from such a prolonged absence. The leadoff track, "Women", was selected as the first single for the US and Canada, instead of "Animal", in July 1987. Then-manager Cliff Burnstein reasoned that the band needed to reconnect with their hard rock audience first before issuing more Top 40-friendly singles. "Women" became a top 10 hit on the rock chart, peaking at number seven, but as predicted, did not make a large impact on the Billboard Hot 100, peaking at number 80.

The success of the album's fourth single, "Pour Some Sugar on Me" would propel the album to the top of the US Billboard 200 albums chart on 23 July 1988, nearly a year after its release - topping the chart three separate times for a combined total of six weeks. Seven singles were eventually released in the United States, with "Love Bites" reaching number one, and three others reaching the top ten. The singles earned similar success in the United Kingdom.  In the Billboard issue dated 8 October 1988, Def Leppard held the No. 1 spot on both the singles and album charts with "Love Bites" and Hysteria, respectively.

Hysteria went on to dominate album charts around the world for three years. It was certified 12× platinum by the RIAA in 2009. The album currently sits as the 51st best selling album of all time in the US. It spent 96 weeks in the US top 40, a record for the 1980s it ties with Born in the U.S.A. The album has sold more than 20 million copies worldwide.

Speaking to Kerrang! in May 2008 about the album's success, Joe Elliott remembered:
For us the first album showed promise, the second showed the true reality of where we were going, the third album worked better in America than it did in England simply because there was no exposure radio-wise over here but by the time we did Hysteria, everything had fallen into place. Airplay and hit singles were one aspect of it but there was also all the hard work we put into the album – we literally did slave over it to get every sound on it right. There was also Rick's accident, of course, and to be honest, I'm sure there was the initial wave of sympathy but I'm equally sure the album would have still worked anyway. None of the other stuff – the touring, the promotion, the videos – none of that would have meant anything if the songs hadn't been there and I'm still really proud of all the songs on Hysteria.
On 24 October 2006, a 2-CD "deluxe edition" of the album was released, including a remastering of the original B-sides and bonus tracks from the album's period. These songs include "Tear It Down", "I Wanna Be Your Hero", "Ride Into The Sun" (originally released in 1979 on The Def Leppard E.P.) and "Ring of Fire".  Many of these songs, alongside two other Hysteria compositions "Desert Song" and "Fractured Love", had been featured on Retro Active, albeit with remixes, revamps, and new parts added. The deluxe edition Hysteria deluxe CD included the original B-side versions of these recordings without alterations.

Another song, "Tonight" was originally recorded on 5 May 1988 during a break in the Hysteria World Tour as a possible B-side to one of the album's upcoming singles.  The song was shelved and later re-recorded for the Adrenalize album.  The 1988 demo version, which includes Steve Clark on guitar, was eventually released on various CD singles, album deluxe editions and box sets.

Finally, a very tongue in cheek cover of "Release Me" which was made famous by Engelbert Humperdinck in 1967 was released as a B-side under the guise of Stumpus Maximus and the Good Ol' Boys.  Stumpus Maximus was Malvin Mortimer, a member of the band's road crew and later became their tour manager. The Good Ol' Boys were the members of Def Leppard, singing backup on what is essentially a parody version of the song.

During their 22 March to 10 April 2013 residency at The Joint, Def Leppard performed the album in its entirety, from start to finish. This was followed up with a live album Viva! Hysteria, recorded during the residency and released on 22 October 2013, which includes all of band's fourth studio album being played live.

This would be followed up seven years later as "Hysteria: Live at the O2" was released on 29 May 2020, as part of the "London to Vegas" box set.  The live concert was filmed at The O2 Arena in London, England on 6 December 2018, as the band once again played the album in its entirety.  Various releases have included a stand-alone edition of this concert have featured combinations of audio, DVD and blu-ray discs.

In the liner notes to the album, the band apologized for the long wait between albums, and promised to never force fans to wait that long between albums again. However, later events, particularly the death of lead guitarist Steve Clark, delayed the next album, Adrenalize, by almost five years.

Critical reception

Hysteria received generally positive reviews. AllMusic's Steve Huey awarded it five stars, stating, "Pyromanias slick, layered Mutt Lange production turned into a painstaking obsession with dense sonic detail on Hysteria, with the result that some critics dismissed the record as a stiff, mechanized pop sell-out (perhaps due in part to Rick Allen's new, partially electronic drum kit)."  Huey characterized the album as "pop metal" rather than heavy metal, with reference to the production of Mutt Lange, and called it "arguably the best pop-metal album ever recorded."

In 2005, Hysteria was ranked number 464 in Rock Hard magazine's book The 500 Greatest Rock & Metal Albums of All Time. Hysteria got the same placement on Rolling Stones list of the 500 best albums of all time, the magazine also ranked the album atop its list of the 50 greatest hair metal albums, and they placed the album on their list of "50 Rock Albums Every Country Fan Should Own".
Loudwire placed the album at No. 2 on their list of the top 30 hair metal albums. Hysteria was also included in the book 1001 Albums You Must Hear Before You Die. L.A. Weekly and Consequence of Sound both ranked the album #8 on their Hair Metal album lists. Metal Rules put the album on their list of the Top 50 Glam Metal Albums, at #30. The Ringer called Hysteria "the greatest hair-metal album ever made".

"I can say objectively – because I wasn't in the band then – that Hysteria is one of the greatest records of all time," remarked Leppard guitarist Vivian Campbell.

Track listing

Notes
 Rocket samples dialogue from NASA's Apollo 11 launch as spoken by Jack King.

30th anniversary editions 
On 4 August 2017, the band released 30th Anniversary editions of the album. This included remasters of the original songs, B-sides and remixes from the albums era on two discs, the Classic Albums documentary episode of the making of the album, and an audio only version of the Live: In the Round, in Your Face video, recorded in Denver, Colorado at McNichols Sports Arena on 12 and 13 February 1988. This release omits four songs from the concert: "Don't Shoot Shotgun", "Let It Go", "Tear It Down" and "Travelin' Band" (Creedence Clearwater Revival cover) as well as a Steve Clark guitar solo. Two songs, Armageddon It and Pour Some Sugar On Me, were performed twice in order to record music videos.

Notes
 *Mislabeled as "Lunar Mix (radio edit)", this is a rare promo mix edited from the album version. It differs heavily from the actual Lunar Mix radio edit, which contains elements from both the album version and the full-length Lunar Mix and cuts the second verse in half. The version used for the music video and for Vault significantly shortens the bridge section of the Lunar Mix radio edit.

Personnel

Def Leppard
Joe Elliott – vocals
Phil Collen – guitars, backing vocals
Steve Clark – guitars, backing vocals
Rick Savage – bass, backing vocals, jangle guitar on "Hysteria"
Rick Allen – drums, backing vocals
The Bankrupt Brothers (Def Leppard, Robert John "Mutt" Lange, Rocky Newton) - backing vocals
Gary Kemp - additional backing vocals on "Animal" (uncredited)

Production
Robert John "Mutt" Lange – producer
Nigel Green – engineering, engineering assistance, mixing
Ronald Prent – engineering
Erwin Musper – engineering
Pete Williscroft – engineering
Mark Flannery – tape operation
Philip "Art School" Nicholas – Fairlight CMI programming
Mike Shipley – mixing
Bob Ludwig – mastering
Howie Weinberg – mastering
Ross Halfin – photography
Laurie Lewis – photography
Andie Airfix (Satori) – illustration, artwork and design

Charts

Weekly charts

Year-end charts

Certifications

See also
List of best-selling albums
List of best-selling albums in the United States
List of glam metal albums and songs
Classic Albums

References

External links

Hysteria (Adobe Flash) at Radio3Net (streamed copy where licensed)

Def Leppard albums
1987 albums
Mercury Records albums
Vertigo Records albums
Albums produced by Robert John "Mutt" Lange